Schoot may refer to:

 Schoot (Eindhoven), a quarter of Eindhoven, the Netherlands
 Schoot (Tessenderlo), a hamlet near Tessenderlo, Belgium
 Schoot (Veldhoven), a hamlet near Veldhoven, the Netherlands

People with the surname
 Lique Schoot (born 1969), Dutch visual artist
 Myrthe Schoot (born 1988), Dutch volleyball player